Demirer is a Turkish surname and may refer to:

 Ata Demirer (born 1972), Turkish filmmaker and stand-up comedian 
 Mertcan Demirer (born 1993), Turkish professional footballer 
 Rojda Demirer (born 1980), Turkish actress